Texas Chainsaw Massacre: The Next Generation (originally released as The Return of the Texas Chainsaw Massacre) is a 1994  American slasher film written and directed by Kim Henkel, and starring Renée Zellweger, Matthew McConaughey, and Robert Jacks as Leatherface. The plot follows four teenagers who encounter Leatherface and his murderous family in backwoods Texas on the night of their prom. It is the fourth installment in the Texas Chainsaw Massacre series, and also features cameo appearances from Marilyn Burns, Paul A. Partain, and John Dugan, all stars of the original film. Marilyn Burns, who portrays "Patient on Gurney", is credited as "Anonymous" in the film.

Writer-director Kim Henkel had previously co-written the original The Texas Chain Saw Massacre (1974) with Tobe Hooper; the events of the previous two sequel films are addressed in The Next Generations opening prologue as "two minor, yet apparently related incidents" which happened after the events of the original film. Next Generation was shot on location in rural areas outside of Austin, Texas.

The film received a limited release in the United States and Japan in 1995 under its original title The Return of the Texas Chainsaw Massacre, but was not distributed any more widely at the time. Two years later, after Zellweger and McConaughey had both become major Hollywood stars, the film was re-cut and released on August 29, 1997 under the new title Texas Chainsaw Massacre: The Next Generation, but was a critical and financial failure. Though a full soundtrack was never released, a companion single featured in the film performed by star Robert Jacks and Debbie Harry from Blondie was released on compact disc in 1997.

The next entry in the series was a remake of the original film, The Texas Chainsaw Massacre, produced by Michael Bay with original creators Kim Henkel and Tobe Hooper as co-producers. Following this was a prequel to remake, subtitled The Beginning. Another entry, Texas Chainsaw 3D was released in 2013 as a direct sequel to the original 1974 film. There would be one more installment to the original series, a "prequel" of its own, titled Leatherface that was released in 2017. The latest installment in the original series is Texas Chainsaw Massacre (released in 2022), which takes place in the same continuity as the original four films.

Plot
On May 22, 1994, four teenagers—Barry, Heather, Jenny, and Sean—attend their school’s prom. When Heather discovers Barry cheating on her with another girl, she storms out of the dance, followed closely by Barry, who tries to explain himself as they drive away in his car. Their argument is interrupted by Jenny and Sean, who are hiding in the backseat, smoking marijuana. Heather takes a detour off the freeway, and while distracted, collides with another motorist, who passes out in the ensuing confusion. Jenny, Heather, and Barry leave Sean to look after the unconscious motorist, while they search for help.

They stop at an office trailer, where they meet Darla, an insurance agent, who promises to call her boyfriend, a tow truck driver named Vilmer. They leave the office and begin heading back towards the wreck, only for Heather and Barry to become separated from Jenny in the darkness. Vilmer soon shows up at the scene of the wreck, killing the motorist, before chasing Sean in his truck and backing over him repeatedly.

Meanwhile, Heather and Barry become separated from Jenny and discover an old farmhouse in the woods. As Barry looks around, Heather is attacked by Leatherface on the porch swing and subsequently forced into a meat locker. One of Vilmer and Leatherface’s family members, W. E., finds Barry and holds him at gunpoint before forcing him inside. Barry tricks W. E. and locks him out but while using the bathroom, Barry discovers a corpse in the bathtub. He is then killed by Leatherface with a sledgehammer. After killing Barry, Leatherface impales Heather on a meat hook.

Jenny returns to the scene of the wreck, where she is met by Vilmer, who offers her a ride. She accepts, only for Vilmer to threaten her, before showing her the bodies of Sean and the motorist. Jenny jumps out of the truck and runs into the woods. She is soon attacked by Leatherface, resulting in a lengthy chase through the farmhouse, where she finds several preserved corpses in an upstairs bedroom.

After leaping through an upstairs window, Jenny manages to flee the property. She seeks refuge from Darla, who reveals herself to be in league with the killers when W. E. shows up and beats her with a cattle prod. The two put her in Darla’s trunk and she leaves to pick up some pizzas for dinner. After being tormented by Vilmer, Jenny momentarily escapes, attempting to drive off in Darla’s car. She is stopped by Vilmer, who knocks her unconscious. She soon awakens at a dinner table, surrounded by the family, who reveal they are employed by a secret society to terrorize people that may cross their path. A man named Rothman shows up, reprimanding Vilmer for his methods, before revealing an array of scars and piercings on his torso and licking Jenny’s face. Rothman leaves and Vilmer terrorizes his family and Jenny, killing Heather by crushing her skull under his cybernetic leg, and knocking W. E. unconscious with a hammer.

Vilmer and Leatherface prepare to kill Jenny, who breaks free and, using the control to Vilmer’s leg, escapes. Jenny reaches a dirt road, where she is rescued by an elderly couple in an RV. However, Leatherface and Vilmer run them off the road, resulting in the RV falling on its side. Jenny emerges from the vehicle unscathed and continues running, with Leatherface and Vilmer in hot pursuit. A plane swoops down on Vilmer, killing him when one of the wheels grazes his skull. Leatherface screams in anguish, while Jenny looks on. A limousine pulls up and Jenny jumps in the backseat, where she is met by Rothman, who apologizes, explaining her experience was supposed to be spiritual and Vilmer had to be stopped. He offers to take her to a police station or a hospital, dropping her off at a hospital, where she speaks to an officer. Sally Hardesty, being pushed by on a gurney, meets Jenny’s gaze. Back on the dirt road as the sun sets Leatherface continues to flail his chainsaw in despair.

Cast

Analysis

Secret society subplot
The film has been noted for its implementation of a secret society subplot driving Leatherface's family to terrorize civilians in order to provoke them to a level of transcendence; in a retrospective interview, Kim Henkel confirmed that the basis of the subplot was influenced by theories surrounding the Illuminati. Commenting on the film's ominous Rothman character, Henkel stated: "He comes off more like the leader of some harum-scarum cult that makes a practice of bringing victims to experience horror on the pretext that it produces some sort of transcendent experience. Of course, it does produce a transcendent experience. Death is like that. But no good comes of it. You're tortured and tormented, and get the crap scared out of you, and then you die."

Other references to the Illuminati are made in the film's dialogue, specifically in the scene in which Darla tells Jenny about the thousands-years-old secret society in control of the U.S. government, and makes reference to the Kennedy assassination. Critic Russell Smith noted in discussion of this plot point: "Could the unexplained "them" be an allusion to the insatiable horror audience that always makes these gorefests a good investment, or is it a cabal of governmental powermongers...?"

Many of these subplot questions are answered in Kim Henkel's 2012 follow-up film Butcher Boys, which, although not an official TCM movie in name, may indeed be the next chapter in the story. Henkel's Butcher Boys is often referred to by critics as a "spiritual sequel" to his The Texas Chain Saw Massacre, mainly because it was originally written as one.

Parody and self-reference
The film is recursive in that it opens with an intertitle referring to two "minor, yet apparently related incidents", a joking acknowledgment of the previous two sequels. Justin Yandell of Bloody Disgusting interprets the film as a cynical reimagining of the original film, with Henkel parodying his own work. He cites Leatherface's ineffectiveness at dispatching his victims as well as the archetypical teenage characters as evidence of the film being a commentary on the declining state of horror films in the late 1980s and early 1990s:

Cross-dressing of Leatherface
Another element noted by both critics and film scholars is the film's overt references to cross-dressing in the Leatherface character, which was briefly explored in the original film but implemented to a greater extent. Robert Wilonsky of the Houston Press commented on the film's treatment of the character, writing that the film "turns Leatherface (here played by Robbie Jacks, an Austin songwriter who used to host a smacked-up radio show with Butthole Surfer Gibby Haynes) into a cross-dressing nancy boy who screams more than he saws." According to Henkel, he wrote the character as one who assumes the persona of the person whose face he wears: "The confused sexuality of the Leatherface character is complex and horrifying at the same time," he said in a 1996 interview. Film scholar Scott Von Doviak also took note of this, likening Leatherface's presentation in the film to that of a "tortured drag queen."

Director's Cut
The original cut of the film by director Kim Henkel is approximately 7 minutes longer than the final released version. The original edit of the film has some slightly longer shots of violence and character reactions but the most significant omission in the theatrically released version was the deletion of Jenny's backstory at the beginning of the film. In the original cut, the relationship between Jenny and her stepfather (played by David Laurence) is shown to be fraught, with elements of domestic abuse and molestation shown as she is subjected to his violent outbursts. This later helps to explain why Jenny is not particularly phased when being tortured by Leatherface's family and how she has the strength to fight back against Vilmer when he touches her.

Production

Development
In developing the film, Robert Kuhn stated: 

In a 1996-released documentary on the making of the film, Henkel stated that he wrote the characters as exaggerated "cartoonish" caricatures of quintessential American youth. Henkel cited the murder cases of serial killers Ed Gein and Elmer Wayne Henley as influences on his involvement in both Texas Chainsaw Massacre: The Next Generation and the original The Texas Chain Saw Massacre. Henkel also deliberately wrote themes of female empowerment into the script, specifically in the Jenny character: "It's her story. It's about her transformation, her refusal to shut up, to be silenced, to be victimized. And by extension her refusal to be oppressed. Even by culture... Bringing Jenny into a world in which the culture was grotesquely exaggerated was a way of bringing her to see her own world more clearly – that is to say, my intent was to present a nightmarish version of Jenny's world in the form of the Chainsaw family in order to enlarge her view of her own world."

Filming
The movie was filmed on location at an abandoned farmhouse in Pflugerville, Texas, and nearby Bastrop. The majority of the cast and crew were locals from Austin, aside from James Gale, a stage actor from Houston. Most of the filming took place at night, and was described by makeup artist J.M. Logan as "very, very rough for everyone."

Renée Zellweger reflected on the film in a 2016 interview, and said: "It was very low-budget, so we all shared a tiny Winnebago that the producer of the film — it belonged to him, it was his personal camper. So, you know, makeup was in the front seats and there was a table in the middle for hair, and there was a tiny little curtain by the bathroom. That was where you put your prom dress and your flower on. [...] It was ridiculous. How we pulled that off, I have no idea. I'm sure none of it was legal. Anything we did was a little bit dangerous. But what an experience. It was kamikaze filmmaking."

Release

Theatrical distribution
After a protracted post-production, the film had its world premiere at the South by Southwest Film and Media Conference on March 12, 1995, and received "glowing reviews" at the time. The film was purchased by Columbia Pictures for $1.3 million. The studio agreed to distribute the film theatrically (along with its home-video release), and agreed to spend no less than $500,000 on prints and advertising. The film was released theatrically on September 22, 1995, and was screened in 27 theaters in the United States, grossing $44,272.

Later in 1995, the film was released theatrically and on LaserDisc in Japan, and then was shelved for the following two years, when in 1997, Columbia re-edited, re-titled, and re-released it as Texas Chainsaw Massacre: The Next Generation, slating it for a late August release. According to producer Robert Kuhn, Columbia Pictures had deliberately pushed the film back to await the release of star Renée Zellweger's new film, Jerry Maguire (1996), which the producers agreed to; McConaughey's agent then purportedly put "pressure" on Columbia Pictures to not release the film theatrically, which caused complications between Henkel and the studio.

In a 1997 interview with The Austin Chronicle, Robert Kuhn stated that:

The film was released theatrically as Texas Chainsaw Massacre: The Next Generation in a limited release in approximately twenty U.S. cities on August 29, 1997 under a co-distribution deal between Columbia Pictures and Cinépix Film Properties. The theatrical release featured the re-cut version of the film, which excised a total of seven minutes from Henkel's original cut. The film earned $53,111 on 23 screens between August 29 and September 1, 1997. It would go on to gross a total of $185,898 domestically (including both the 1995 and 1997 versions), making it the poorest-performing Texas Chainsaw Massacre film.

Critical response

Reviewing the film after a screening at the Boston Film Festival in 1995, Betsy Sherman of The Boston Globe referred to the film as a "shameless rehash" of the original, adding: "Henkel's idea of an imaginative stroke is to put [Leatherface] in red lipstick and black widow drag. No thanks, Julie Newmar." Critic Joe Bob Briggs championed the film upon its South by Southwest screening, referring to it as "a flick so terrifying and brilliant that it makes the other two Chainsaw sequels seem like 'After-School Specials.'"

Upon the film's 1997 re-release, much of the critical reviews focused on the lead performances of Zellweger and McConaughey, who had garnered significant fame in the interim. Janet Maslin of The New York Times wrote: "It was way back in 1995 that this schlocky horror farce, then known as Return of the Texas Chainsaw Massacre, first appeared with the unknown actors Matthew McConaughey and Renee Zellweger in starring roles. But even in a film whose principal props include litter, old pizza slices and a black plastic trash bag, it's clear that these two were going places." Rob Patterson of the Austin American-Statesman awarded the film three out of four stars and praised the performances, noting: "Everyone here certainly pushes at the ceiling of near-absurdity, yet The Next Generation never quite goes over the top." Terry Lawson of the Detroit Free Press similarly championed the lead performances of Zellweger and McConaughey, but expressed disappointment in the "Men in black" subplot and that writer-director Henkel "turns poor Leatherface into a whimpering drag queen." The New York Daily News also noted that "Zellweger impresses in her strenuous, scream-driven turn as Jenny."

Mike Clark of USA Today called the film "The kind of cinematic endeavor where you suspect both cast and crew were obligated to bring their own beer," while Owen Gleiberman wrote in Entertainment Weekly that the film "recapitulates the absurdist tabloid-redneck comedy of the great, original Chainsaw without a hint of its primal terror." Margaret McGurk of The Cincinnati Enquirer also remarked the film's narrative, writing: "The script, such as it is, establishes a new benchmark for incoherence. Something about some teens who wander away on prom night and run up against a family of psycho-cannibal-thrill-killers... Of course, there is no point to any of it, either the humor or the creepy (though relatively bloodless) mayhem—except maybe the permanent embarrassment of poor Matthew [McConaughey] and Renée [Zellweger]." Dann Gire of the Daily Herald suggested "a massacre might be less painful." John Anderson of Newsday wrote that the film was the kind that "Wes Craven's Scream has now rendered virtually defunct... What we want from Texas Chainsaw Massacre: The Next Generation is a giddy mix of gruesome horror and campy humor. What we get is less massacre than mess."

Joe Leydon of Variety wrote that the film "manages the difficult feat of being genuinely scary and sharply self-satirical all at once... it is adept at keeping its audience in a constant state of jumpiness." He also lauded Zellweger's performance, calling her "the most formidable scream queen since Jamie Lee Curtis went legit." The Hollywood Reporters Dave Hunter similarly noted the film as being "blackly comic and extreme." The Austin Chronicle also gave the film a favorable review, stating: "Writer-director Kim Henkel penned the original Chainsaw and this effort shows that he still has a felicitous grasp of the things that cause us to shudder in dread."

Texas Chainsaw Massacre: The Next Generation holds a 16% rating on review aggregator Rotten Tomatoes, based on 37 reviews with an average rating of 3.6/10. Its consensus reads, "The Next Generation has the fortune of starring early-career Matthew McConaughey and Renée Zellweger, but it services neither headliner well in a convoluted and cheap-looking slasher that doesn't live up to the Texas Chainsaw Massacre legacy." On Metacritic the film holds a score of 50 out of 100, based on reviews from 11 critics, indicating "mixed or average reviews".

Home media
In late 1995, the film saw its first home video release in the form of a LaserDisc released in Japan under its original Return... title.

The subsequent home video releases also occurred through Columbia Tristar Home Video: it was first released on VHS in September 1998, and on DVD on July 13, 1999. The original Columbia Tristar DVD release was reissued with new cover artwork in 2003. In 2001, Lionsgate, who purchased Cinépix Film Properties shortly after the film's 1997 theatrical run, released the film on DVD in Canada; the Canadian release featured the original 94-minute cut of the film.

Scream Factory announced in June 2018 a collector's edition Blu-ray release of the film; originally slated for September 25 release date, it was delayed until December 11. Bloody Disgusting reported at the time that the proposed artwork for the release, which had originally featured stars Zellweger and McConaughey, had to be altered to remove both actors due to licensing issues. The Blu-Ray release featured the theatrical cut, a 93-minute director's cut with optional commentary by writer-director Henkel, and several other special features.

Soundtrack
The film's soundtrack featured many local Texan bands, but never received a release. However, star Robert Jacks, a friend of Blondie's Debbie Harry, produced a song with Harry titled Der Einziger Weg (sic; English: The Only Way; the correct German title would be "Der einzige Weg"), a single written for and featured in the film. The song was released by Eco-Disaster Music in 1997 as a single on compact disc, featuring Debbie Harry on the cover with a portrait of Jacks as Leatherface, featured in his three costumes, on the wall behind her.

Songs featured in the film:

Notes

References

Sources

External links

 

1995 horror films
1995 films
1997 horror films
1997 films
Texas Chainsaw 4
Texas Chainsaw 4
American comedy horror films
American independent films
American sequel films
American slasher films
American teen horror films
Columbia Pictures films
Cross-dressing in American films
1990s English-language films
Fictional secret societies
Films produced by Kim Henkel
Films set in abandoned houses
Films set in Texas
Films shot in Texas
Films shot in Austin, Texas
Films about proms
Films about the Illuminati
Films with screenplays by Kim Henkel
Films about self-harm
Next Generation, The
1990s American films